Martin Körner (born 30 December 1935) is a German former skier. He competed in the Nordic combined event at the 1960 Winter Olympics.

References

External links
 

1935 births
Living people
German male Nordic combined skiers
Olympic Nordic combined skiers of the United Team of Germany
Nordic combined skiers at the 1960 Winter Olympics
People from Klingenthal
Sportspeople from Saxony